Risdon Park is a suburb of Port Pirie in South Australia. It was derived from a private subdivision comprising sections 88, 101, 102, 104 and 107 of the Hundred of Pirie. Its boundaries were fixed in 1978 and have been adjusted in 1995.

Community

Risdon Park Primary School and the Central Risdon netball team are based in the town.  Risdon Park High School closed in 1994 by merging in to John Pirie Secondary School and no longer uses the campus.

References

Port Pirie
Towns in South Australia